Bruno Périer (born December 28, 1966 in Soyaux, France) is a former professional footballer who played as a midfielder.

See also
Football in France
List of football clubs in France

References

External links
Bruno Périer profile at chamoisfc79.fr

1966 births
Living people
French footballers
Association football midfielders
Blagnac FC players
Chamois Niortais F.C. players
La Roche VF players
Ligue 1 players
Ligue 2 players
Luçon FC players
UA Cognac players